Oak Run can refer to:
Oak Run, California
Oak Run, Illinois
Oak Run Township, Madison County, Ohio
Oak Run (Wolf Run), in Lycoming County, Pennsylvania